Louis Duhamel (January 1, 1835 – October 27, 1915) was a Canadian physician and political figure in Quebec. He represented Ottawa electoral district in the Legislative Assembly of Quebec from 1875 to 1886 as a Conservative member.

He was born Roch Duhamel in Verchères, Lower Canada, the son of François Duhamel and Josephte Audet, and was educated at the Collège d'Ottawa and McGill University, qualifying to practice as a doctor in 1860. Duhamel practised in Ottawa, Pembroke and in Wright County. He also owned a drug store in Hull. He was married twice: to Félonise Bel in 1862 and to Ézilda Mazurette dit Lapierre, the widow of Césaire Thérien, in 1901. Duhamel was registrar for Ottawa County from 1886 to 1915 and prothonotary at Hull from 1901 to 1915. He died in Hull at the age of 80.

Duhamel's residence in Hull later became the Chez Henri hotel, declared a historic monument by the city of Gatineau in 2003.

References

External links
 

1835 births
1915 deaths
Canadian physicians
Conservative Party of Quebec MNAs
People from Verchères, Quebec
McGill University alumni
University of Ottawa alumni